Scrobipalpopsis petasitis is a moth in the family Gelechiidae. It was described by Franz Pfaffenzeller in 1867. It is found in northern Europe, the Alps and on the Taimyr Peninsula.

The wingspan is 15–20 mm.

References

Scrobipalpopsis
Moths described in 1867